The Serbian Water polo League A is the highest level of men's water polo in Serbia and it is organized by the Water polo Federation of Serbia.

History

Kingdom of Yugoslavia / SFR Yugoslavia

Domestic water polo club competition in Serbia started in 1921, three years after Kingdom of Serbia became Kingdom of Yugoslavia, although officially was known as Kingdom of Serbs, Croats and Slovenes between 1918 and 1929. It was the first season of the Yugoslav Water Polo Championship which was played regularly from 1921 to 1991 with only exception being between 1940 and 1944 when the league was halted because of the Second World War. The first edition was won by VK Polet Sombor, which will also become Yugoslav champion in 1922 and 1924. However, the period referring to the kingdom of Yugoslavia between 1921 and 1940 was dominated by VK Jug Dubrovnik who won 14 out of 20 editions.

The later period referring to SFR Yugoslavia between 1945 and 1991 was dominated by VK Partizan who won 17 out of 46 editions.

FR Yugoslavia / Serbia and Montenegro
In the early 1990s several of the Yugoslav republics broke-away and in 1992 Serbia and Montenegro formed the FR Yugoslavia Water Polo Championship which would be played until 2006. Since in 2003 the country was renamed from FR Yugoslavia to Serbia and Montenegro, the league also followed the name changed properly in its 3 last editions. During this period another Serbian club came into prominence, VK Bečej, which won 6 out of 15 editions. Montenegrin clubs won 5 editions, 4 of which were won in the consecutive 4 last editions by PVK Jadran Herceg-Novi, and one by VK Budva in 1994. The rest of the editions were won by Serbian clubs, namely VK Crvena zvezda in 1992 and 1993, and VK Partizan in 1995 and 2002.

Serbia
In 2006 Montenegro declares independence and, consequently, the Serbian Water Polo League A and Montenegrin First League of Water Polo are formed. In the Serbian League A VK Partizan restored its domination by winning the first 6 consecutive editions.

Current teams
The following 10 clubs compete in the Serbian Water Polo League A during the 2021–22 season:

Champions

Performances

All–time champions
 1921 to present

Serbian water polo clubs in European competitions
LEN Champions League

LEN Cup Winner's Cup

LEN Euro Cup

LEN Super Cup

COMEN Cup

Notable players

  beso akhvlediani
  Gela Koiava
  batuma
  Filip Filipović
  Archil Bagashvili
  Nikola Kuljača
  Dušan Mandić
  Stefan Mitrović
  Gojko Pijetlović
  Duško Pijetlović
  Andrija Prlainović
  Nikola Rađen
  Dejan Savić
  Slobodan Soro
  [[Vanja Udovičić
  Vladimir Vujasinović
  Danilo Tenenbojm
  Marko Martinić
  Nino Blažević
  Damir Burić
  Josip Vrlić
  Gijom Dino
  Theodoros Chatzitheodorou
  Angelos Vlachopoulos
  Arshia Almasi
  Kohei Inaba
  Roman Pilipenko
  Alexey Shmider
  Rustam Ukumanov
  Predrag Jokić
   Denis Šefik
  Zdravko Radić
  Aleksandar Radović
  Boris Zloković
  Stevie Camilleri
  Bilal Gbadamassi
  Lucas Gielen
  Ivan Gusarov
  Matej Nastran
  Robin Pleyer
  Ryan Bailey
  John Mann
  Michael Rozenthal
  Andy Stevens

See also
 Serbia men's national water polo team

External links
  
 Water Polo news in Serbia at vaterpolovesti.com 
 Serbian Water Polo League A at waterpoloworld.com 

1
Serbia
Professional sports leagues in Serbia